Marcel Aragão (born 24 March 1978) is a Brazilian judoka. He competed in the men's half-middleweight event at the 2000 Summer Olympics.

References

External links

1978 births
Living people
Brazilian male judoka
Olympic judoka of Brazil
Judoka at the 2000 Summer Olympics